Shalfleet is a village and civil parish on the Isle of Wight. it is located between Yarmouth and Newport in the northwest of the island.

Background
The name "Shalfleet" means "shallow stream". The stream in this case is the stream passing through the village, the Caul Bourne. It was recorded as "Aet Scealdan Fleote" in the 838. In 1086, in the Domesday Book, Shalfleet was called "Selceeflet". In Adam and Charles Black's guide book to the area published in 1870, there is a note that Shalfleet is "not too lively". It still has only one street with a traffic light at each end. Church of St. Michael the Archangel, Shalfleet was dedicated to St. Michael the Archangel in 1964. The Baptist church in the village of Wellow, was founded in 1801. There were several Methodist churches as well, which have all closed. Shalfleet had a railway station, shared with Calbourne, that was closed in 1953 when the line from Newport to Freshwater ceased operating. The New Inn pub dates from 1743.

The Domesday Book noted the existence of the Shalfleet Mill. This mill was driven by a waterwheel. The associated bakery produced bread until the 1920s. There are three manor houses in the Shalfleet area that were mentioned in the Domesday book; the Shalfleet Manor House, Ningwood Manor, and 
Hamstead Manor.

In August 2009 metal detectorists searching near Shalfleet discovered an Iron Age hoard, the Shalfleet Hoard, consisting of four large bowl-shaped silver ingots, six small silver fragments, and one gold British B (or, 'Chute',) stater. The discovery of this hoard contributes to the evidence that the Isle of Wight was occupied by the Celtic tribe, the Durotriges, during the Late Iron Age. The hoard was reported to the Portable Antiquities Scheme, sent to the British Museum for examination, and ultimately sold at auction.

The village is linked to other parts of the Island by Southern Vectis bus route 7, serving Freshwater, Yarmouth and Newport as well as intermediate villages.

References

External links
 Shalfleet Church of England Primary School website

Villages on the Isle of Wight
Civil parishes in the Isle of Wight